is a train station in Arakawa, Tokyo, Japan.

Lines 
The station is served by the Nippori-Toneri Liner rubber-tyred automated guideway transit (AGT) system operated by Tokyo Metropolitan Bureau of Transportation (Toei).

Station layout
This elevated station consists of a single island platform serving two tracks.

History 
The station opened on 30 March, 2008, when the Nippori-Toneri Liner began operating.

Station numbering was introduced to the Nippori-Toneri Liner platforms in November 2017, with the station receiving station number NT03.

References

External links
Toei Akado-shogakkomae Station 

Railway stations in Tokyo
Railway stations in Japan opened in 2008
Nippori-Toneri Liner